Can't You See may refer to:

 "Can't You See" (The Marshall Tucker Band song), 1973
 "Can't You See" (Total song), 1995
 "Can't You See", a song by Tiffany from Dreams Never Die, 1993
 "Can’t You See", a song by Why Don't We from 8 Letters, 2018